The Women's League of Burma is a community-based organisation working on the rights of women from Burma, with a focus on systematic sexual violence in ethnic areas, and women's involvement in political processes, especially in the peace process. It is a membership organisation comprising various ethnic minority women groups from Burma.

Its headquarters are in Chang Mai, Thailand, and has offices around the region.

History 
With the brutal military regime of the State Peace and Development Council ruling Burma and employing systematic rapes as an instrument of control, many women, men and children have fled to the jungle or border areas surrounding the country, and into neighbouring countries such as Thailand and Bangladesh.

Several groups came together to organise an annual forum for these women's organisations, in the spirit of the Panglong Agreement. In the second year, on 9 December 1999, the groups decided that a single collective voice would concentrate resources, thereby amplifying their calls for common goals, especially in the political processes.

Profile 
Women's League of Burma is the only women's political organisation involved in the constitution-drafting activities of the pro-democracy movement, the Federal Constitution Drafting Coordinating Committee, supported by the Center for Constitutional Democracy in Plural Societies at the Indiana University Maurer School of Law.

Member organisations 
The Women's League of Burma member organisations include:
 Burmese Women's Union (BWU)
 Kachin Women's Association - Thailand (KWAT)
 Karen Women's Organisation (KWO)
 Karenni National Women's Organisation (KNWO)
 Kayan Women's Organisation (KYWO)
 Kuki Women's Human Rights Organisation (KWHRO)
 Lahu Women's Organisation (LWO)
 Palaung Women's Organisation (PWO)
 Pa-O Women's Union (PWU)
 Rakhaing Women's UNion (RWU)
 Shan Women's Action Network (SWAN)
 Tavoy Women's Union (TWU)
 Women's Rights and Welfare Association of Burma (WRWAB)

Awards 
One of their noted activists, Khin Ohmar, won the 2008 Anna Lindh Prize and the 2008 Vital Voices Global Leadership Award for Human Rights, which she shared with SWAN activist Charm Tong.

See also 
 Women in Burma

References

External links
 
 

Burmese democracy movements
Human rights organizations based in Thailand
Women's organisations based in Myanmar
Violence against women in Myanmar
Violence against women in Thailand
Women's rights in Myanmar
Women's rights in Thailand